HD 95808 is a double star in the constellation of Crater. Its apparent magnitude is 5.50, but interstellar dust makes it appear 0.11 magnitudes dimmer than it should be. It is located some 340 light-years (104 parsecs) away, based on parallax.

HD 95808 is a G-type giant star. At an age of 680 million years old, it has swelled up to a radius of 10.1 times that of the Sun, and it is 2.43 times as massive. It emits 64.6 times as much energy as the Sun at a surface temperature of 5,029 K.

References

Crater (constellation)
Double stars
G-type giants
Durchmusterung objects
095808
054029
4305